Boel may refer to:

Böel, a municipality in the district of Schleswig-Flensburg, in Schleswig-Holstein, Germany
Boel Berner (born 1945), Swedish sociologist, historian, and editor
Delphine Boël (born 1968), a Belgian artist
a variation of the female name Bodil